Boudinage is a geological term for structures formed by extension, where a rigid tabular body such as hornfels, is stretched and deformed amidst less competent surroundings. The competent bed begins to break up, forming sausage-shaped boudins.  Boudinage is common and can occur at any scale, from microscopic to lithospheric, and can be found in all terranes. In lithospheric-scale tectonics, boudinage of strong layers can signify large-scale creep transfer of rock matter. The study of boudinage can also help provide insight into the forces involved in tectonic deformation of rocks and their strength.

Boudinage can develop in two ways: planar fracturing into rectangular fragments or by necking or tapering into elongate depressions and swells. Boudins are typical features of sheared veins and shear zones where, due to stretching along the shear foliation and shortening perpendicular to this, rigid bodies break up. This causes the resulting boudin to take a characteristic sausage or barrel shape. They can also form rectangular structures. Ductile deformation conditions also encourage boudinage rather than imbricate fracturing. Boudins can become separated by fractures or vein material; such zones of separation are known as boudin necks.

In three dimensions, the boudinage may take the form of ribbon-like boudins or chocolate-tablet boudins, depending on the axis and isotropy of extension. They range in size from about 20 m thick to about 1 cm.

Types
There are three different types of boudinage. These include no-slip boudinage, s-slip boudinage, and a-slip boudinage. No-slip boudinage occurs when there is no slip, resulting in a symmetrical structure. S-slip boudinage occurs when the boudin moves in opposition to the shear movement, whereas A-slip occurs when it moves with the direction of the shear. These types can be further classified into 5 different groups with relation to their general shape. These groups are  drawn, torn, domino, gash and shearband boudins. In general, drawn and torn shapes form where there is a no-slip boudinage, domino and gash boudins by A-slip, and shearband boudins by S-slip boudinage.

Etymology
Lohest (1909) coined the term boudinage, which is derived from the French word "boudin", meaning blood sausage. Boudins were first observed and described by Belgian geologists in the Collignon quarry near Bastogne in the Ardennes (Belgium).

References

Urai, J. L., Spaeth, G., van der Zee, W. & Hilgers, C. (2001). Evolution of Mullion (Boudin) structures in the Variscan of the Ardennes and Eifel. In: Jessell, M. J. (2001). General Contributions: (2001). Journal of the Virtual Explorer, 3, 1-16 https://web.archive.org/web/20070908134406/http://www.virtualexplorer.com.au/journal/2001/03/urai/ 
 

Structural geology
Metamorphic rocks